Zelleria wolffi is a moth of the family Yponomeutidae. It is found on the Canary Islands and Madeira.

References

Moths described in 1983
Yponomeutidae